"Help Me Somebody" is a 1953 song by The "5" Royales.  The single was the second to chart for the group and became their second and final number one on the R&B chart.  The B-side, "Crazy, Crazy, Crazy", reached number five on the R&B chart.

References

1953 singles
The "5" Royales songs
1953 songs
Songs written by Lowman Pauling